The 14th Armored Brigade, also known as Tunç Kışlası ( Bronze Barracks), is a brigade of the Turkish Army based in Northern Cyprus at the town of Kythrea in Nicosia.

It is part of the Aegean Army Cyprus Turkish Peace Force ( II.Corps) based at TRNC.

Unit Elements 

 Brigade headquarters.
 I. Tank battalion (M60A1-A3)
 II. Tank battalion (M48A5T1): stationed in Asha
 III. Tank battalion (M48A5T2 & Leopard 2A4)
 I. AVLB & ARV platoon. 
 I. Self-propelled gun battalion (M44 T & T-155 Fırtına)
 I. Air defense battalion (Flugabwehrkanone  20 mm Zwilling & M42 Duster )
 I. Pedestal mounted Stinger platoon (ATILGAN PMSS)
 I. Mechanized Infantry Support Battalion (M113 APC BGM-71 TOW, ACV-30 IFV )
 I. Engineer squadron
 I. Signal battalion
 I. Chemical defense & CBRN platoon
 I. Logistics support company
 I. Maintenance and repair company
 I. Medical company

References

Turkish Land Forces
Brigades of Turkey